Draparnaudia anniae is a species of air-breathing land snail, a terrestrial pulmonate gastropod mollusk in the family Draparnaudiidae.

Distribution
This species is endemic to New Caledonia in Melanesia.

References

Draparnaudiidae
Endemic fauna of New Caledonia
Gastropods described in 1995
Taxonomy articles created by Polbot